Magda Maria was the name of two ships used by pirate radio stations.

, used by Radio Nord
, used by Radio Paradijs

Ship names